p-Cresidinesulfonic acid (4-amino-5-methoxy-2-methylbenzenesulfonic acid) is used to make specialty dyes for food products.  It is a synthetic organic chemical that the United States imports from China, India, and Japan.

References

External sources
United States International Trade Commission
chemicalregister.com

Benzenesulfonic acids
Anilines
Phenol ethers